Köseköy railway station is a railway station in Kartepe, Turkey, in the İzmit metropolitan area. TCDD Taşımacılık operates four daily regional trains between Istanbul and Adapazarı that stop at the station. The station was originally built in 1975 by the Turkish State Railways, when the Istanbul-Ankara railway was realigned to bypass İzmit's city center. The Köseköy Logistics Center is located adjacent to the station and is an important freight yard on the railway.

Köseköy station was closed down on 1 February 2012 due to construction of the Ankara-Istanbul high-speed railway. The station was reopened in 2018.

References

External links
TCDD Taşımacılık

Railway stations in Kocaeli Province
Railway stations opened in 1975
1975 establishments in Turkey